DUB, founded in January 2000, is a North American magazine covering urban custom car culture and also features celebrities and their vehicles.

The magazine also launched the DUB Magazine Custom Auto Show & Concert, a nationwide car show and concert tour that spans 16 United States cities.  DUB now has many licensed goods that include Jada Toys' DUB City die-cast and radio controlled vehicles, DUB Edition car accessories, and Rockstar Games' Midnight Club 3: DUB Edition video game.

The term "DUB" is street slang for custom wheels 20" or larger in diameter and was popularized through hip hop music.

DUB was founded by Myles Kovacs, Haythem Haddad, and Herman Flores, who continue to head the company located in Santa Fe Springs, CA.

See also
 Dub (wheel)

External links
 DUB Magazine website
 DUB Show Tour website
 Back issues

Automobile magazines published in the United States
Bimonthly magazines published in the United States
Magazines established in 2000
Magazines published in California